Clearfield is a city in Taylor and Ringgold counties in the U.S. state of Iowa. The population was 278 at the time of the 2020 census.

History
Clearfield was platted in 1881 when the Humeston and Shenandoah Railroad was being built through that territory. The town was incorporated in 1882.

Geography
Clearfield's longitude and latitude coordinates in decimal form are 40.800133, -94.476286.

Demographics

2010 census
As of the census of 2010, there were 363 people, 153 households, and 87 families living in the city. The racial makeup of the city was 97.8% White, 0.6% African American, 0.3% Native American, and 1.4% from two or more races. Hispanic or Latino of any race were 1.7% of the population.

There were 153 households, of which 22.2% had children under the age of 18 living with them, 43.8% were married couples living together, 7.8% had a female householder with no husband present, 5.2% had a male householder with no wife present, and 43.1% were non-families. 35.9% of all households were made up of individuals, and 21.5% had someone living alone who was 65 years of age or older. The average household size was 2.17 and the average family size was 2.78.

The median age in the city was 50.7 years. 22% of residents were under the age of 18; 4% were between the ages of 18 and 24; 18.7% were from 25 to 44; 25.1% were from 45 to 64; and 30.3% were 65 years of age or older. The gender makeup of the city was 46.8% male and 53.2% female.

2000 census
As of the census of 2000, there were 371 people, 163 households, and 93 families living in the city. The racial makeup of the city was 98.65% White, and 1.35% from two or more races. Hispanic or Latino of any race were 1.62% of the population.

There were 163 households, out of which 20.2% had children under the age of 18 living with them, 49.7% were married couples living together, 5.5% had a female householder with no husband present, and 42.9% were non-families. 39.3% of all households were made up of individuals, and 27.6% had someone living alone who was 65 years of age or older. The average household size was 2.05 and the average family size was 2.75.

In the city, the population was spread out, with 16.4% under the age of 18, 8.1% from 18 to 24, 15.9% from 25 to 44, 25.3% from 45 to 64, and 34.2% who were 65 years of age or older. The median age was 52 years. For every 100 females, there were 75.0 males. For every 100 females age 18 and over, there were 73.2 males.

The median income for a household in the city was $23,203, and the median income for a family was $35,125. Males had a median income of $26,346 versus $17,143 for females. The per capita income for the city was $13,810. About 6.2% of families and 10.7% of the population were below the poverty line, including none of those under age 18 and 16.3% of those age 65 or over.

Education
Much of the city a part of the Lenox Community School District, while a portion is in the Mount Ayr Community School District.

It was in the Clearfield Community School District until 2014.

References

External links

 

Cities in Iowa
Cities in Taylor County, Iowa
Cities in Ringgold County, Iowa
1881 establishments in Iowa